The List of Air National Guard Squadrons is sorted by squadron number with unit emblem, location, command, and aircraft type. Flying squadrons means that they are currently flying or were flying in their past. The other squadrons are not flying, with future status unknown.

Flying squadrons

Non-flying squadrons 
Certain non-flying ANG squadrons in the previous list were formerly flying squadrons prior to BRAC-directed force reductions in the 1990s and 2000s and/or USAF budget-driven force reductions imposed by sequestration in 2013 and subsequent.

 111th Space Operations Squadron
 112th Air Operations Squadron 
 114th Space Control Squadron 
 116th Air Control Squadron
 117th Air Control Squadron
 117th Intelligence Squadron
 119th Command and Control Squadron
 123rd Intelligence Squadron
 125th Special Tactics Squadron
 130th Engineering Installation Squadron
 137th Space Warning Squadron
 140th Air Defense Squadron
 141st Air Control Squadron
 148th Space Operations Squadron
 152nd Intelligence Squadron
 152nd Combat Operations Squadron
 153rd Command and Control Squadron
 176th Air Control Squadron
 192d Intelligence Squadron
 194th Intelligence Squadron
 202nd Engineering Installation Squadron
 205th Engineering Installation Squadron
 210th Engineering Installation Squadron

 211th Engineering Installation Squadron
 212th Engineering Installation Squadron
 213th Engineering Installation Squadron
 213th Space Warning Squadron
 214th Engineering Installation Squadron
 215th Engineering Installation Squadron
 216th Engineering Installation Squadron
 217th Engineering Installation Squadron
 218th Engineering Installation Squadron
 219th Engineering Installation Squadron
 220th Engineering Installation Squadron
 234th Intelligence Squadron
 241st Engineering Installation Squadron
 241st Air Traffic Control Squadron
 243rd Air Traffic Control Squadron (USAF)
 243d Engineering Installation Squadron
 245th Air Traffic Control Squadron
 259th Air Traffic Control Squadron
 263d Combat Communications Squadron
 267th Combat Communications Squadron
 270th Air Traffic Control Squadron
 272nd Combat Communications Squadron
 273rd Engineering Installation Squadron
 282nd Combat Communications Squadron
 290th Joint Communications Support Squadron

References

External links 

 
Air National Guard
Air National Guard Squadrons